Xenodium is a genus of fungi in the family Elsinoaceae.

References 

Myriangiales
Taxa named by Hans Sydow